Petr Tatíček (born 22 September 1983) is a Czech professional ice hockey centre who is currently an unrestricted free agent. He most recently played for ERC Ingolstadt of the Deutsche Eishockey Liga (DEL). He has previously played for the Florida Panthers of the National Hockey League (NHL).

Playing career
Tatíček was drafted ninth overall by the Florida Panthers in the 2002 NHL Entry Draft from the Sault Ste. Marie Greyhounds of the Ontario Hockey League (OHL) and played just three games for the Panthers during the 2005–06 NHL season, going pointless. On 9 March 2006, Tatíček was traded to the Pittsburgh Penguins in exchange for Richard Jackman, but never played for them, spending the remainder of the season with their American Hockey League (AHL) affiliate, the Wilkes-Barre/Scranton Penguins.

Tatíček then signed with the Washington Capitals as a free agent, but only played one game for their AHL affiliate, the Hershey Bears, before returning to the Czech Extraliga with HC Kladno. Later in the season, he moved to HC Davos of the Swiss Nationalliga A.

On 22 July 2014, Tatíček signed as a one-year contract as a free agent with Deutsche Eishockey Liga (DEL) club ERC Ingolstadt. On 23 November 2014, during the 2014–15 season, and having quickly adapted to the DEL and among the team's top scoring line, Tatíček was signed to a three-year contract extension to remain in Ingolstadt.

Career statistics

Regular season and playoffs

International

Awards and honours

References

External links

1983 births
Living people
Czech ice hockey centres
HC Davos players
Florida Panthers draft picks
Florida Panthers players
Hershey Bears players
Houston Aeros (1994–2013) players
Rytíři Kladno players
ERC Ingolstadt players
Laredo Bucks players
HC Lev Praha players
National Hockey League first-round draft picks
People from Rakovník
San Antonio Rampage players
Sault Ste. Marie Greyhounds players
Wilkes-Barre/Scranton Penguins players
Sportspeople from the Central Bohemian Region
Czech expatriate ice hockey players in Canada
Czech expatriate ice hockey players in the United States
Czech expatriate ice hockey players in Switzerland
Czech expatriate ice hockey players in Germany